The 2005 Rugby Canada Super League season was the eighth season for the RCSL.

Standings
Western Division
{| class="wikitable" style="text-align: center;"
|-
! width="250"|Team
! width="20"|Pld
! width="20"|W
! width="20"|D
! width="20"|L
! width="20"|F
! width="20"|A
! width="25"|+/-
! width="20"|BP
! width="20"|Pts
|-
|align=left| Saskatchewan Prairie Fire
|6||6||0||0||207||80||+127||6||30
|-
|align=left| Vancouver Island Crimson Tide
|6||5||0||1||255||86||+169||6||26
|-
|align=left| Edmonton Gold
|6||3||0||3||138||124||+14||2||14
|-
|align=left| Calgary Mavericks
|6||3||0||3||165||135||+30||2||14
|-
|align=left| Vancouver Wave
|6||2||0||4||195||211||-16||5||13
|-
|align=left| Manitoba Buffalo
|6||2||0||4||132||165||-32||3||11
|-
|align=left| Vancouver Island Raiders
|6||0||0||6||63||354||-291||0||0
|}

Eastern Division
{| class="wikitable" style="text-align: center;"
|-
! width="250"|Team
! width="20"|Pld
! width="20"|W
! width="20"|D
! width="20"|L
! width="20"|F
! width="20"|A
! width="25"|+/-
! width="20"|BP
! width="20"|Pts
|-
|align=left| Newfoundland Rock
|6||6||0||0||251||74||+177||5||29
|-
|align=left| Niagara Thunder
|6||5||0||1||203||97||+106||5||25
|-
|align=left| Toronto Xtreme
|6||3||1||2||164||114||+50||4||18
|-
|align=left| Ottawa Harlequins
|6||3||1||2||132||120||+12||3||17
|-
|align=left| Quebec Caribou
|6||2||0||4||90||182||-84||1||9
|-
|align=left| Nova Scotia Keltics
|6||1||0||5||99||160||-61||4||8
|-
|align=left| New Brunswick Black Spruce
|6||0||0||6||50||242||-192||2||2
|}

Championship final

The Newfoundland Rock (Eastern Division champions) defeated the Saskatchewan Prairie Fire (Western Division Champions) 26–13 in the Championship Final, played in Regina, Saskatchewan on 13 August 2005 to win the MacTier Cup.

References

Rugby Canada Super League seasons
RCSL Season
2005 in Canadian rugby union